Lea Blackham from Polstead, (born 1950), is an English male indoor bowler.

He is an England Senior National Champion  and qualified from the Bromley playoffs to play in the 2018 World Indoor Bowls Championship. He started bowling at the age of 53 at the Sudbury Bowls Club but now bowls indoors for the Ipswich IBC.

References

1950 births
Living people
English male bowls players
People from Polstead